The Latvian Permanent Representative to NATO is the official representative of Latvia to the North Atlantic Treaty Organization. The Representative has the rank of full ambassador and is appointed by the President. The full official title of the Representative is Latvia Permanent Representative on the Council of the North Atlantic Treaty Organization, with the rank and status of Ambassador Extraordinary and Plenipotentiary. The current Latvian Ambassador to NATO is Edgars Skuja.

List

References

 
NATO
NATO-related lists
Latvia